Herlong is a surname. Notable people with the surname include:

 Bertram Nelson Herlong (1934–2011), bishop
 Henry Michael Herlong Jr. (born 1944), American judge
 M. H. Herlong, author of the 2012 novel Buddy
 Syd Herlong (1909–1995), American politician